Ray High School may refer to one of the following:

Ray High School (Arizona); Kearny, Arizona
W. B. Ray High School; Corpus Christi, Texas